Talwai is a village in Dharwad district of Karnataka, India.

Demographics 
As of the 2011 Census of India there were 181 households in Talwai and a total population of 932 consisting of 490 males and 442 females. There were 132 children ages 0-6.

References

Villages in Dharwad district